HMS St Aubin was a Saint-class tug launched in 1918.

It was owned by the Admiralty until 12 April 1924, when it was sold to Shanghai Tug and Lighter Limited. 
On 8 March 1935, she was involved in a collision with SS Kiang Shun and was sunk in the Huangpu River. The sunken ship was not considered a significant threat to navigation, and was only raised more than six months later, on 25 September. On 4 July 1936, she was once again sunk in a collision with the naval cadet ship Ping An and SS Eugenia Chandris, and had to be raised.

In February 1940, the ship was requisitioned as a minesweeper and served under the Hong Kong Royal Naval Volunteer Reserve, where she was commanded by Lieutenant-Commander Peter Dulley. From 1943, the ship was laid up, until 1946 when she was returned to her owner. In November 1946, she was transferred to Yee Kee Tug & Lighter Co., and in 1947 she was renamed Tsze-Hong. In 1948, she was once again transferred to Chinese Maritime Trust Ltd. She was sunk off Taiwan on 9 November 1950.

References

1918 ships
Ships built by Harland and Wolff
Ships built in Govan
Tugboats of the Royal Navy
World War II minesweepers of the United Kingdom
World War II minesweepers of Hong Kong
Maritime incidents in 1950